Tong Mengshi (born 22 January 1993), is a Chinese actor.

Early life and education
Tong was born in Xuzhou, Jiangsu. Under his father's influence he became a National second-level athlete, specializing in 100-metre dash.

Tong studied at the China University of Mining and Technology. He worked as an advertisement model prior to his debut.

Career
In 2014, Tong participated in the variety program Journey On Sail. The following year, he became known after participating in the variety program One Grade Graduation.

In 2016, Tong made his acting debut with a supporting role in the xianxia drama  Noble Aspirations. The same year, he played his first lead role in the romance web series Proud of Love.

In 2017, Tong starred in the fantasy suspense drama Colorful Bone. In 2018, Tong played lead roles in the youth sports drama Basketball Fever, and fantasy wuxia drama The Taoism Grandmaster.

In 2019, Tong portrayed the role of Ying Zheng in the historical drama The Legend of Haolan. The same year, he gained recognition for his role as Wu Zhu in the historical drama Joy of Life.

He played the lead role of Yang Guo in the wuxia drama The New Version of the Condor Heroes, based on the novel of the same name by Louis Cha.

Filmography

Television series

Discography

Awards and nominations

References

External link

 
 

1993 births
Living people
People from Xuzhou
Male actors from Jiangsu
21st-century Chinese male actors
Chinese male television actors
China University of Mining and Technology alumni